Charles John Lonsdale (born 5 July 1965) is a British diplomat who was Ambassador to Armenia 2008–2012. He is the son of author and scholar Roger Lonsdale

Lonsdale was Second Secretary in Budapest, Hungary from 1990 to 1993, and First Secretary in Moscow, Russia from 1998 to 2000.

At the Foreign & Commonwealth Office in London, UK, Lonsdale was Deputy Head of the Afghanistan Group from 2003 to 2005, and then Deputy Head of the Human Rights, Democracy and Governance Group.

After leaving Armenia, Lonsdale was briefly Chargé d'Affaires at the British Embassy in Dushanbe, Tajikistan.

He speaks French, Russian, Hungarian and Armenian.

References
LONSDALE, Charles John, Who's Who 2012, A & C Black, 2012; online edn, Oxford University Press, Dec 2011, accessed 22 July 2012

1965 births
Living people
Alumni of Merton College, Oxford
Ambassadors of the United Kingdom to Armenia